is a former Japanese football player and manager.

Playing career
Yoshida was born in Shiwa, Iwate on May 17, 1965. After graduating from high school, he joined Furukawa Electric (later JEF United Ichihara) in 1984. He played many matches as side back from 1986 and the club won the champions 1986 JSL Cup and 1986 Asian Club Championship. This is first Asian champions as Japanese club. In 1995, he moved to Japan Football League club Brummell Sendai. He retired end of 1997 season.

Coaching career
After retirement, Yoshida became a coach for Sony Sendai in 1998. In September 2001, he became a manager as Kazuaki Nagasawa successor. He managed the club until 2003. In 2006, he signed with Regional Leagues club Grulla Morioka based in his local Iwate Prefecture. He managed the club until 2011.

Club statistics

References

External links

1965 births
Living people
Association football people from Iwate Prefecture
Japanese footballers
Japan Soccer League players
J1 League players
Japan Football League (1992–1998) players
JEF United Chiba players
Vegalta Sendai players
Japanese football managers
Iwate Grulla Morioka managers
Association football midfielders